Victory College may refer to:
 Victory College, Australia a K to 12 school in Queensland, Australia.
 Victoria College, Alexandria a college in Egypt.
 Victory University, a college in Memphis, Tennessee, United States.